Marcos Maturana del Campo (c. 1802 – August 29, 1871) was a Chilean military and political figure who served in the Chilean War of Independence and the War of the Confederation.

Maturana was born in San Fernando, the son of Manuel Jesús Maturana Guzmán and of Petronila del Campo. In 1818, (at the age of 16) he became a cadet of the Húsares de la Muerte under Manuel Rodríguez, and participated in the Battle of Maipú, during the Chilean War of Independence. By 1820 he already was a second Lieutenant, and a member of the expedition to Peru, where he fought in the siege of Callao. Maturana was promoted to captain in 1824, and participated in the Chiloé campaigns of 1825 and 1826.

During the Chilean Civil War of 1829, he participated in the battles of Ochagavía and Lircay. In 1831 Maturana was promoted to Major and in 1834 to Lieutenant colonel. During the War of the Confederation he fought at the battles of Portada de Guías (1838) and Yungay (1839), and in the capture of Lima. In 1847 he was promoted to Colonel and named Aide-de-camp to President Manuel Bulnes.

On April 20, 1851, during the Urriola mutiny, he successfully defended his barracks against the attack of a full regiment and decisively contributed to the restoration of the public order. Maturana participated in the Occupation of the Araucanía during the later stages of the Arauco War, was promoted to Brigade General in 1854 and Division General in 1865. In 1855 he was elected Deputy for Santiago until 1858. President José Joaquín Pérez named him Minister of War and Navy, a position he held between July 9, 1862 and January 4, 1865. In 1864 he was again elected a deputy and in 1866, he became the Senior General Officer (equivalent to Army Commander-in-chief) and a Councilor of State. In 1867 he was elected Senator and reelected in 1870, position he retained until his death. 

He retired from the Chilean Army in 1870, after 57 years, 4 months and 9 days of service and died in Santiago the following year, at the age of 69.

See also
Juan Albano Pereira Márquez
Marcos Segundo Maturana Molina
Pedro Nolasco Vergara Albano

1802 births
1871 deaths
People from San Fernando, Chile
Chilean people of Spanish descent
Chilean Ministers of Defense
Members of the Senate of Chile
Members of the Chamber of Deputies of Chile
Chilean Army generals
People of the War of the Confederation